Lissotesta is a genus of minute sea snails or micromolluscs, marine gastropod molluscs, unassigned in the superfamily Seguenzioidea.

Species
Species within the genus Lissotesta include:

 Lissotesta ambigua Dell, 1956
 Lissotesta arenosa Laseron, 1954
 Lissotesta aupouria Powell, 1937
 Lissotesta benthicola Powell, 1927
 †Lissotesta beta Laws, 1939
 Lissotesta bicarinata Powell, 1940
 Lissotesta conoidea Powell, 1937
 Lissotesta decipiens Powell, 1940
 Lissotesta errata Finlay, 1927
 †Lissotesta exigua (Suter, 1917)
 Lissotesta gittenbergeri (van Aartsen & Bogi, 1988)
 Lissotesta granum (Murdoch and Suter, 1906
 Lissotesta impervia (Strebel, 1908)
 Lissotesta inscripta (Tate, 1899)
 Lissotesta japonica (A. Adams, 1861)
 Lissotesta liratula (Pelseneer, 1903) 
 Lissotesta macknighti (Dell, 1990)
 Lissotesta major Warén, 1992
 Lissotesta mammillata (Thiele, 1912)
 Lissotesta micra (Tenison-Woods, 1876)
 Lissotesta minima (Seguenza, 1876)
 Lissotesta minutissima (E. A. Smith, 1907) 
 Lissotesta notalis (Strebel, 1908)
 Lissotesta oblata Powell, 1940
 Lissotesta otagoensis Dell, 1956
 †Lissotesta pygmaea Lozouet, 1999
 Lissotesta radiata (Hedley, 1907)
 Lissotesta scalaroides Rubio & Rolán, 2013
 Lissotesta similis (Thiele, 1912)
 Lissotesta strebeli (Thiele, 1912)
 Lissotesta studeri (Thiele, 1912)
 Lissotesta turrita (Gaglini, 1987)
 Lissotesta unifilosa (Thiele, 1912)
 †Lissotesta virodunensis Lozouet, 1999

Nomen dubium
 Lissotesta humilis (Pelseneer, 1903)

References

 Kano Y., Chikyu, E. & Warén, A. (2009) Morphological, ecological and molecular characterization of the enigmatic planispiral snail genus Adeuomphalus (Vetigastropoda: Seguenzioidea). Journal of Molluscan Studies, 75:397-418.

Further reading 
 Powell A. W. B., New Zealand Mollusca, William Collins Publishers Ltd, Auckland, New Zealand 1979 
 ZipCodeZoo
  Gofas, S.; Le Renard, J.; Bouchet, P. (2001). Mollusca, in: Costello, M.J. et al. (Ed.) (2001). European register of marine species: a check-list of the marine species in Europe and a bibliography of guides to their identification. Collection Patrimoines Naturels, 50: pp. 180–213
 Spencer, H.; Marshall. B. (2009). All Mollusca except Opisthobranchia. In: Gordon, D. (Ed.) (2009). New Zealand Inventory of Biodiversity. Volume One: Kingdom Animalia. 584

 
Extant Miocene first appearances